This is a list of football (soccer) clubs in Côte d'Ivoire.

For a complete list see :Category:Football clubs in Ivory Coast

Clubs

A 
 A.C. Bouake
 A.C. Sinfra
 A.C. Vavaou
 A.S.A.F.A.
 A.S. Beogouro
 A.S. Boda
 A.S. Breton Marcoury
 A.S. Divo
 A.S. Oume
 A.S. Prikro
 A.S. Poda
 A.S. R.A.N. Agboville
 A.S. Sempa De San Pedro
 A.S. Sotra
 A.S. Young Stars
 A.S.C. Bouake
 A.S.C. Cocody
 A.S.C. Ouragahio
 A.S.I. D'Abengourou
 Abidjan Universite Club
 Academie de Sefa
 Académie de Sol Beni
 Africa Sport Abidjan
 Aeroport F.C.
 AFA Djekanou Moossou
 Agneby F.C.
 Akouye F.C.
 AS Athletic FC Daoukro
 AS Denguele Odienne
 ASC Ouragahio
 ASEC Mimosas Abidjan
 Assoue
 Athletic FC Adjame
 Atlantique Saint Michel
 Avenir Biankouma

B 
 Bale Sports Buyo
 Ban Sport Danane
 Boca Sports De Bocanda
 Bonoua Sports
 Botro F.C.
 Bouake Universite Club

C 
 C.I.D.I.A.F.A. Yopougon
 C.N.O.U.
 Club Omnisport Bouaflé
 C.O.S.A.P.
 C.O.S.A. San Pedro
 Centre De Formation Selaf
 Club Omnisport Korhogo
 Cosmos F.C.
 cf technicko

D 
 Denguelé Sports d'Odienné
 Djibetoa Tabou

E 
 E.B.C. Arrah
 E.C.A.F.
 E.E.C.I.
 E.F.C. Soubre
 E.F.Y.M.
 E.S. Senou
 Edus D'Aboisso
 ES Bingerville
 Espoir Daloa
 Espoir Koumassi
 Esperance Football Club de Bouake (EFCB)

F 
 FC Adzopé
 F.C. Hire
 F.C. Yokolo

G 
 Galaxie J.S.I.
 Gbalet S.P. Du Buyo
 Guerry F.C.

I 
 Issia Wazi FC

J 
 J.A.C. Zuenoula
 J.S. Beoumi
 J.S. Katiola
 Jeunesse Club Abidjan
 Juventus D'Alepe

K 
 Kantro Sports Guiglo

L 
 Lagoke F.C.
 Lahou Essor
 Lakota F.C.
 Lazer

M 
 M.F.C. Tankesse
 Man FC
 Mela F.C.
 Makan F.C.
 Mala Sport
 Moossou F.C.

N 
 N'zi F.C. Dimbokro
 Nicla Sports
 Nigou F.C.
 Niyou F.C.

O 
 Olympic Club Abidjan
 Omness De Dabou
 Onze Freres
 Oryx F.C. Yopougon

P 
 Paloma F.C.
 Panification Industrielle Christian (P.I.C.)

R 
 R.C. Beniakrou
 R.C. Bettie
 R.C. Koumassi
 R.C. Tiassale
 R.F.C. Daoukro
 R.F.C. Yamoussoukro
 R.X. Abobo
 Rayon Esperance Marcory
 Red Star Abidjan
 Renaissance Abengourou
 Réveil Club de Daloa
 Rio Sport d'Anyama

S 
 Sabé Sports de Bouna
 Sacraboutou
 Satellite FC du Plateau Abidjan
 Selafe Treichville
 Séwé Sports de San Pedro
 Sigui Sport
 Siguilo Seguela
 Silveyre Star Koumassi
 Siroco F.C.
 Sporting Club de Gagnoa
 S.O.A.
 Stade Breton
 Stade d'Abidjan
 Stella Club d'Adjamé

T 
 AS Tanda
 Toulepleu F.C.
 Toumodi F.C.

U 
 U.S. Bella
 U.S. Duekoue
 U.S.Koumassi F.C.
 U.S. Yakro
 U.S. Yamoussoukro
 USC Bassam
 Union S. Man

V 
 Vallee A.C. D'Adjame

W 
 W.A.C. De Williamsville
 W.A.C. Gagnoa
 W.A.C. Selafe

Y 
 Yogoma Sport

Z 
 Zanzan F.C.

Leagues 

1.Liga

 ASEC Mimosas
 Académie F.A. Diallo
 Stella Club d'Adjamé
 Séwé Sports de San-Pédro
 Denguelé Sports d'Odienné
 Jeunesse Club d'Abidjan
 Africa Sports
 Société Omnisports de l'Armée
 ASC Ouragahio
 Issia Wazi FC
 Stade d'Abidjan
 Sabé Sports de Bouna
 USC Bassam
 Football Club Hiré

2.Liga

 Football Club Adzopé
 Man FC
 Ecole de Football Yéo Martial(EFYM)
 EDUS Aboisso
 Oryx FC de Yopougon
 RC Koumassi
 CO Korhogo
 USK Koumassi
 Espoir de Koumassi
 AS AGIR Guibéroua
 AS Athlétic Adjamé
 Moossou FC
 RC Béttié
 SS Bondoukou
 US Fermiers Agnibilékrou
 CO Bouaflé
 NZi FC
 Hiré FC
 Ban Sport
 Lakota FC
 ASI d'Abengourou
 US Yamoussoukro
 ASC Ouragahio
 RFC Daoukro

3.Liga

 ECAF Abidjan
 Cosmos Football Club de Koumassi
 Williamsville Athletic Club
 Rio-Sports d'Anyama
 AS Juventus d'Alépé
 Satellite Football Club du Plateau
 Agnéby Sport d'Agboville
 ASC Cocody
 Tchéloué Football Club de Adiaké
 Moossou FC de Grand-Bassam
 Santa Cruz d'Alépé
 Racing Football
 CO Cyril Domoraud
 Sikensi Football Club
 Siguilolo FC de Séguéla
 Nicla Sport de Guiglo
 AS Espérance Bafing
 Jeunesse Athletic Club de Zuénoula
 Niyou Football Club de Niedrou
 AS AGIR Guibéroua
 AS Gbalet Sport de Buyo
 US Gadouan
 AS Sempa de San-Pédro
 AS Union Sportive Diégonéfla
 COSAP de San-Pédro
 FC San-Pédro
 AS Tanda
 RFC Yamoussoukro
 Guery Football Club
 AFAD Académie Amadou Diallo de Djékanou
 Renaissance Club de Tiassalé
 Kokumbo Football Club
 RFC Daoukro
 Toumodi Football Club
 Mala Sport
 Sigui Sport de Gouméré
 Association Sportive Divo
 Egnanda FC de Zaranou

4.Liga

 ASA de Sankadiokro
 EBC d’Arrah
 FC Moussa LEAO d’Agnibilékrou
 US d’Apprompron
 USC d’Adzopé

Ligue d'Abidjan nord 1

 AS Pierre Mereaud de Memni
 Royal Atlantic de Djibi
 Futur RPO d’Azaguié
 AS young star de Montezo

Ligue d'Abidjan nord 2

 OMNESS de Dabou
 ES Abobo
 US 3A FC de Jacqueville
 Star Olympic d’Achokoi
 ASAFA d’Agboville
 AS Rubino

Ligue de Yamoussoukro

 AS Daoukro
 US Sakassou
 Kanbonou FC de Tiébissou
 Élan sportif de Boundiali
 N’demagnon de Touba

Ligue d'Abidjan sud 1

 Bonoua sports
 Pirates de Samo
 US Krindjabo
 ASCI d’Assinie
 Adinglo FC De Ahigbe Koffikro
 Schadrac FC Maféré

Ligue d'Abidjan sud 2

 JFC sud Comoe d’Aboisso
 Selafe FC d'Abidjan
 CIDIAFA d’Abidjan
 ECAF d’Abidjan

Ligue de San-Pédro 1

 FC Soubré
 Siroco de San-Pédro
 Phare sport de Tabou
 AS Stevicor de Sassandra

Ligue de San-Pédro 2

 Lahou essor de Grand-Lahou
 Athlantis FC de Sassandra
 Yocoboué FC
 Fresco FC

Ligue de Bondoukou 1

 Yegueman de Sandégué
 SIGUI sport de Gouméré
 Sorobango FC
 AS KPODA de Songouri
 Sapli Hossi sport de Sapli

Ligue de Bondoukou 2

 Tankesse FC de Tankessé
 Djara sport d’Assuéfry
 Effieni sport de Guiendé
 Nagabari FC de Tabagne

Ligue de Bouaké 1

 AS juventus de Katiola
 Djidja FC de Dabakala
 TNCA de Niakara
 AUKAS FC de Botro
 ASC Bouaké

Ligue de Bouaké 2

 Diamasse de M'bahiakro
 Bouaké FC
 Espérance de Bouaké
 Alliance club de Bouaké

Ligue de Daloa 1

 Yokolo FC
 Tizake de Gbohué
 St Raphael FC de Bouaflé
 CIFAD de Gonaté
 AS Binkady de Zoukougbeu

Ligue de Daloa 2

 AS Gnagbodougnoa
 Atomic de Lakota
 ES COD Dairo de Divo
 Toutoubré FC de Toutoubré
 US Bayota
 Zoukobouo

Ligue de Man 1

 Angelique FC de Man
 Kouibly FC de Kouibly
 Makinde FC de Sangouiné
 Degnan academy FC de Facobly
 Cefat FC de Gbonné
 Tonkpi FC de Logoualé

Ligue de Man 2

 Niyou FC de Diéouzon
 Koulayae de Blolequin
 Football club de Zou
 Peko FC de Bangolo
 Espoir de Guézon

External links
 Club Soccer

Ivory Coast

Football clubs
Football